Euploea tulliolus, the dwarf crow or small brown crow, is a butterfly found in the Solomon Islands, Malaysia, Taiwan, Vietnam, Singapore and Australia, that belongs to the crows and tigers, that is, the danaid group of the brush-footed butterflies family. It has a wingspan of about 4 to 8 centimeters.

Due to the purple iridescence of the butterfly under sunlight, the butterfly is also commonly referred to as the purple crow (紫斑蝶).

The Taiwanese population engages in a mass migration from the north of Taiwan to the south and back again. During the migration the main highway blocking their route has protective netting put in place and butterfly numbers are tracked with traffic restricted during the peak of the swarm's crossing.

References

External links
Euploea tulliolus, at funet.fi

Euploea
Butterflies of Singapore
Butterflies of Indochina
Butterflies of Taiwan
Butterflies described in 1793